National Road 20 (abbreviated as EO20) is a single carriageway road in northwestern Greece. It links the cities of Ioannina and Kozani via Konitsa and Siatista. It passes through the Ioannina, Kastoria and the Kozani regional units. Since the opening of the A2 (Egnatia Odos), it is no longer the fastest connection between Kozani and Ioannina. The section between Ioannina and Kalpaki is part of the European route E853.

Route
The western end of National Road 20 is in the centre of Ioannina, where it is connected with the national roads GR-5, GR-6 and GR-17. It runs northwest towards Kalpaki (junction with GR-22), where it turns northeast towards Konitsa. Between Konitsa and Tsotyli it passes through the Pindus mountains. The section between Neapoli and Siatista is shared with the GR-15. From Siatista the GR-20 continues east, until it reaches the city Kozani, its eastern terminus.

The National Road 20 passes through the following places (west to east):
Ioannina
Metamorfosi
Kalpaki
Pyrsogianni
Eptachori
Pentalofos
Tsotyli
Neapoli
Siatista
Xirolimni
Vatero
Kozani

References 

20
Roads in Western Macedonia
Roads in Epirus (region)
Pindus